The Rabbinical Council of California is the primary representative body of Orthodox Judaism in California. Its three primary areas of operation are overseeing Kashrut certification in the state, maintaining a Beit Din and community liaison.

The current president is Rabbi Meyer H. May, the VPs are Rabbi Amram Gabay and  Rabbi Sholom Tendler.

External links
 Rabbinical Council of California Website

Kosher food certification organizations
Orthodox Judaism in California
Rabbinical organizations